Radford Army Ammunition Plant (RFAAP) is an ammunition manufacturing complex for the U.S. military with facilities located in Pulaski and Montgomery Counties, Virginia. The primary mission of the RFAAP is to manufacture propellants and explosives in support of field artillery, air defense, tank, missile, aircraft, and naval weapons systems. As of 2011 RFAAP is operated by BAE Systems under contract to the US Army Joint Munitions Command.  The current Commander for the Radford Army Ammunition Plant (RAAP) is LTC Russell A. Jones.

History
RFAAP was established April 5, 1941 as Radford Ordnance Works and New River Plant. In 1945, the works was renamed Radford Arsenal and the New River Ordnance Works was assumed as a subpost until 1950, when it became an integral part of the Radford Arsenal. In 1961 the arsenal was renamed Radford Ordnance Plant and RFAAP in 1963. The facility used an ALCO MRS-1 military diesel locomotive, road number B2072, for switching, which was retired by the 1980s and scrapped at Cycle Systems in Roanoke, Virginia around 1993.

In 1995, Alliant Techsystems, parent company ATK Armament Systems, obtained a "facilities use" contract. In 1999, RFAAP gained the load, assembly and pack mission with the closure of Joliet Army Ammunition Plant in Illinois. "Radford is capable of producing mass quantities of solvent and solventless propellants to support direct fire, indirect fire, and rocket applications."

On May 12, 2011, the Army announced that BAE Systems had won the "facilities use" contract to become the plant operator.

Facilities

RFAAP is home to several tenants of similar industry, including:

 New River Energetics – Commercial Propellants
 Alliant Techsystems – Medium Caliber LAP
 Appalachian Railcar Service – Railcar Repair
 Alliant Ordnance – Laboratory Facilities
 Med Cal LAP – Manufacture of 25MM & 30MM Ammo
 Montgomery County PSA – Drinking Water Sales to Montgomery County
 Alexander Arms – Development, manufacturing, and sales of commercial rifles and ammunition
 ALTESS – US Army Acquisition, Logistics & Technology Enterprise Systems & Service
 Waco Inc. – Mechanical work on pipes and buildings, abatement of any asbestos containing materials and lead abatement. 
 Virginia Tech – Rail Car unloading and Coal Storage
 Pyrotechnique by Grucci – Manufacture custom pyrotechnics for fireworks and DOD simulators.
 NTS – testing & lab support
 Cave Spring Painting – Equipment storage for commercial painting
 Alliant Painting – Equipment storage for residential painting
 Valley Turf – Office & Maintenance Shop for RFAAP mowing contractor and lawn tractor repairs<
 US Cellular – Cellular Communications Tower Site
 Crown Castle (CFW Wireless) – Cellular Communications Tower Site
 GDOTS – General Dynamics MK-90 Field Rep Office

Environmental problems
In June 2015 the plant requested a renewal of its permit of an open burning ground which it has used for decades to dispose of its waste.  The ground is "located on the north bank of the New River in the Horseshoe Area, a section of the plant surrounded on three sides by the river". Rapid modernization is addressing this concern.

References

External links
 Radford Army Ammunition Plant website
Joint Munitions Command website

United States Army arsenals
Industrial installations of the United States Army
United States Army logistics installations
United States Army arsenals during World War II
Historic American Engineering Record in Virginia
Montgomery County, Virginia
Pulaski County, Virginia
Virginia Tech